The term Generation Kindle (in Spanish: Generación Kindle) refers to authors who publish their works digitally through Kindle Direct Publishing (KDP) for (Amazon.com). The term has been adopted by the media.

Writer Esteban Navarro is said to have coined the term Generation Kindle, a tweet dated February 11, 2012.

Notables
Some of the notable members include:

 Juan Gómez-Jurado
 John Locke
 Amanda Hocking
 Esteban Navarro
 Bruno Nievas
 Blanca Miosi

References

External links 
¿Qué fue de la Generación Kindle?

Literary movements
Cultural history of Spain